Marcelo Daniel Colombo (born March 27, 1961 in Buenos Aires, Argentina) is an Argentine Roman Catholic prelate of the Roman Catholic Church who has been serving as the bishop of La Rioja since 2013.

Biography 
Born in Buenos Aires, Argentina. He graduated at the College San Francisco de Sales in Buenos Aires for earning bachelor of expert mercantile. In 1989 he became a lawyer to conclude his legal studies at the University of Buenos Aires. In 1982 he entered seminary of Quilmes and Colombo studied philosophy at the Theological Faculty of Buenos Aires in Villa Devoto, while theological studies at the Center for Theological and Philosophical Studies of Quilmes.

Priesthood 
On 16 December 1988, he was ordinated to the priesthood. In 1994 he obtained a doctorate in canon law from the Pontifical University of Saint Thomas Aquinas in Rome, Italy. On 8 May 2009 he was appointed by Pope Benedict XVI as the bishop of Orán and Luis Teodorico Stöckler, the bishop of Quilmes gave him the 8 August of the same year episcopal ordination, co-consecrators were Mario Antonio Cargnello, archbishop of Salta and Jorge Rubén Lugones, bishop of Lomas de Zamora. The ceremony took place on 22 August 2009. On 9 July 2013, Pope Francis appointed him as the bishop of La Rioja. On 22 May 2018, Pope Francis named him as the Archbishop of Mendoza and he will be enthroned in his new see on 9 August.

External links 
Catholic-Hierarchy 

1961 births
21st-century Roman Catholic bishops in Argentina
Living people
Clergy from Buenos Aires
Roman Catholic archbishops of Mendoza
Roman Catholic bishops of Orán